Rancourt may refer to the following places in France:

 Rancourt, Somme, a commune in the Somme department
 Rancourt, Vosges, a commune in the Vosges department

See also
 Rancourt (surname)